"It Took Me So Long to Get Here, But Here I Am" is a song by Scottish recording artist KT Tunstall. It was released as an iTunes promotional song off her fifth studio album KIN, following the release of the single "Maybe It's a Good Thing".

The song was released on 20 August 2016. The song was produced by Tony Hoffer and is qualified as Tunstall's favourite on the album.

Music video 

A music video was released on 30 November 2016 by Tunstall herself, featuring Emily May Hunt, Hayley Jones, Misa Koide, and dancer
Daniel Boham.

Track listing

References

External links

KT Tunstall songs
Songs written by KT Tunstall
2016 songs